Mardi Lunn (born 9 January 1968) is an Australian professional golfer. Her sister, Karen Lunn, is also a professional golfer.

Lunn played on several tours including the ALPG Tour, LPGA Tour, and Ladies European Tour. She has won five times worldwide.

Lunn has won once on the LPGA Tour in 1999. Lunn also took part in the largest playoff in LPGA Tour history at the 1999 Jamie Farr Kroger Classic. Se Ri Pak birdied the first sudden death playoff hole to defeat Lunn, Karrie Webb, Carin Koch, Sherri Steinhauer, and Kelli Kuehne.

After retiring in 2006, Lunn has been a caddie for Lisa Hall on the Ladies European Tour.

Professional wins

LPGA Tour wins (1)

LPGA Tour playoff record (0–1)

ALPG Tour wins (2)
1995 Daikyo Ladies Cup
2004 ABC Learning Centres Classic

Ladies European Tour wins (1)
1993 European Ladies Classic

Ladies Asia Golf Circuit wins
1991 Thailand Ladies Open

Team appearances
Amateur
Tasman Cup (representing Australia): 1987 (tied)
Queen Sirikit Cup (representing Australia): 1988 (winners)

References

External links

Australian female golfers
ALPG Tour golfers
LPGA Tour golfers
Ladies European Tour golfers
Sportswomen from New South Wales
People from Cowra
1968 births
Living people